Mademoiselle Josette, My Woman (French: Mademoiselle Josette, ma femme) is a 1933 French comedy film directed by André Berthomieu and starring Annabella, Jean Murat and Edith Méra. It is based on the 1906 play of the same title by Robert Charvay and Paul Gavault. Berthomieu himself remade the film in 1950.

Cast
 Annabella as Josette  
 Jean Murat as André Ternay  
 Edith Méra as Myrianne  
 Jean Marconi as Valorbier  
 Victor Garland as Joe Jackson  
 Gaston Mauger as Dupré  
 Blanche Denège as Madame Dupré  
 Henri Trévoux as Le directeur  
 Pierre Etchepare as Panard  
 Jean Diéner as Dutilleul  
 Arletty 
 Jacques Pills 
 Georges Tabet
 Paul Velsa as Prosper

References

Bibliography 
 James L. Limbacher. Haven't I seen you somewhere before?: Remakes, sequels, and series in motion pictures and television, 1896-1978. Pierian Press, 1979.

External links 
 

1933 films
French comedy films
1933 comedy films
1930s French-language films
Films directed by André Berthomieu
French films based on plays
Remakes of French films
Sound film remakes of silent films
French black-and-white films
1930s French films